Pudsey is a ward in the metropolitan borough of the City of Leeds, West Yorkshire, England.  It contains 47 listed buildings that are recorded in the National Heritage List for England.  Of these, one is listed at Grade I, the highest of the three grades, two are at Grade II*, the middle grade, and the others are at Grade II, the lowest grade.  The parish contains the town of Pudsey, including the area of Swinnow, and the countryside to the southwest, including the village of Tyersal.  It also contains the Fulneck Moravian Settlement, many of whose buildings are listed.  Most of the other listed buildings are houses, cottages, and associated structures, farmhouses and farm buildings, a milestone, public houses, some of which have been converted for other uses, former schools, churches, a bank, and a war memorial.


Key

Buildings

References

Citations

Sources

 

Lists of listed buildings in West Yorkshire
Listed